Nəbilər (Nabilar, formerly known as Quş yuvası or Quşyuvası) is a village in the Kalbajar District of Azerbaijan.

History
The village was occupied by Armenian forces during the First Nagorno-Karabakh war and administrated as part of the Shahumyan Province of the self-proclaimed Republic of Artsakh. After the 2020 Nagorno-Karabakh war, the village was returned to Azerbaijan per the 2020 Nagorno-Karabakh ceasefire agreement.

References

External links

Kushyuvasy  at GeoNames

Populated places in Kalbajar District